Pallavi Gungaram, (born 15 December 1993) also known as Pallavi Ram, is a Mauritian beauty pageant titleholder who was crowned Miss Mauritius 2013, and represented her country at the Miss Universe 2014 pageant. Pallavi Gungaram is making her debut as an actor in the independent movie Ocracoke, released in early 2021.

Early life
Pallavi Gungaram is currently doing her bachelor of science (honors) in psychology at the University of Mauritius as well as her diploma in yoga at the IGCIC.

Pageantry

Miss Mauritius 2013
Pallavi Gungaram, she is the new Miss Mauritius 2013.  The ceremony was held on June 29, 2013, at Johnson & Johnson Auditorium in Vacoas-Phoenix.

Miss Universe 2014
Pallavi represented Mauritius at Miss Universe 2014 but Unplaced at the pageant.

References

External links
Official Miss Mauritius website
 

1993 births
Living people
People from Plaines Wilhems District
Mauritian female models
Mauritian beauty pageant winners
Miss Universe 2014 contestants
Mauritian actresses
Mauritian people of Indian descent
Mauritian Hindus
Female models of Indian descent
Actresses of Indian descent
University of Mauritius alumni